Chung Tai Shan is a Taiwan-based international Chan Buddhist monastic order founded by the Ven. Wei Chueh in 1987. The monastery headquarters, Chung Tai Chan Monastery (or Chung Tai Chan Buddhist Temple, 中台禪寺), completed in September 2001, is located in Puli, Nantou County, in central Taiwan. Widely admired as an architectural masterpiece because of the mountain monastery's more modern look, the temple is second only to Fo Guang Shan's monastery in physical size and in the number of ordained disciples.

The temple follows traditional Chinese Chan teaching, emphasizing sudden enlightenment and gradual cultivation.

Branches
Chung Tai Chan Monastery has established more than 90 meditation centers and branches in Taiwan and abroad, including branches in Australia, Hong Kong, Japan, Philippines, and Thailand.

United States 
Nine Branches of Chung Tai Shan are in the United States 
Chung Tai Zen Center of Sunnyvale, CA  
Buddha Gate Monastery in Lafayette in the East Bay, CA  
Middle Land Chan Monastery in Pomona, CA 
Great Dharma Chan Monastery in Boulder, CO 
Chung Tai Zen Center of Houston, TX 
Chung Tai International Retreat Center in Shepherd, TX 
Buddha Mind Monastery in Oklahoma City, OK  
Buddha Jewel Monastery in Seattle, WA 
Dharma Jewel Monastery in Atlanta, GA

Europe
Hua Yi Si (Monastero Hua Yi) in Rome, Italy

Asia
Pudong Chan Monastery in Osaka, Japan 
Ocean Sky Chan Monastery in the Manila, Philippines 
PuGuang Meditation Center in Hong Kong 
Great Buddha Monastery in Bangkok, Thailand

Australia
Bao Lin Chan Monastery in Melbourne, VIC

See also
 Buddhism in Taiwan
 Four Great Mountains (Taiwan)
 Four Heavenly Kings (Taiwan)
 Chinese Buddhism
 Chan Buddhism

References

External links
 Chung Tai Chan Monastery official site 
 U.S. & other overseas branches of Chung Tai Chan Monastery official sites  

 
Chan Buddhism
Religious organizations established in 1987
Buddhist orders
Schools of Buddhism founded in Taiwan
Buddhist organizations based in Taiwan